Michael Arthur Green (3 October 1891 at Bristol –  at Kensington, London), was an all-round sportsman primarily known as a first-class cricketer for Gloucestershire and Essex, and as a cricket administrator who managed England tours to South Africa and Australia and who was secretary of Worcestershire. He also played soccer and rugby union to county standard.

Green was a career army officer who reached the rank of Brigadier and served in both the First World War and the Second World War. He represented the British Army at cricket, soccer, rugby and squash.

References

External links
Generals of World War II

1891 births
1971 deaths
Military personnel from Bristol
English cricketers
Gloucestershire cricketers
Essex cricketers
Europeans cricketers
Marylebone Cricket Club cricketers
English cricket administrators
Cricketers from Bristol
English rugby union players
Free Foresters cricketers
British Army cricketers
British Army personnel of World War I
British Army brigadiers of World War II
Northamptonshire Regiment officers
Recipients of the Military Cross
Gloucestershire Regiment officers
Rugby union players from Bristol